One Night in with Hope and More Vol. 1 is an album by jazz pianist Roberto Magris released on the JMood label in 2012, featuring performances by the Roberto Magris Trio with Elisa Pruett and Albert “Tootie” Heath.

Reception

The World Music Report review by Paul J. Youngman awarded the album 4 stars and simply states: "Most striking on this album is Roberto Magris’ fluency in combining technique with melody in an unencumbered manner. Sounding effortless, an ease of semplicity, yet runs and mighty chords are struck with spot on precision." The All About Jazz review by C. Michael Bailey simply states: "This disc is not a rote homage to hard bop so much as it is an attentive appreciation rendered by three like-minded musicians recalling a heyday long gone."

Track listing
 Happy Hour (Elmo Hope) - 4:00 
 If You Could See Me Now  Tadd Dameron) - 7:09 
 Theme from “The Pawnbroker” (Quincy Jones/Billy Byers) - 5:49 
 I Didn't Know About You (Duke Ellington) - 5:22 
 Elmo's Delight (Roberto Magris) - 4:42 
 Half May (Herb Geller) - 4:43 
 East 9th Street (Andrew Hill) - 9:12 
 My Heart Stood Still (Rodgers/Hart) - 6:11 
 Fire Waltz (Mal Waldron) - 7:27 
 Audio Liner Notes - 4:24

Personnel

Musicians
Roberto Magris - piano
Elisa Pruett - bass
Albert “Tootie” Heath - drums

Production
 Paul Collins – executive producer and producer
 George Hunt – engineering
 Stephen Bocioaca – design
 Jerry Lockett and Martin Magris – photography

References

2012 albums
Roberto Magris albums